Underground Soul is a project created in 2002 by Italian born DJ, A&R and entrepreneur Eleonora Cutaia.
Originally started as a "cult" community for Soulful music fans, it used to feature reviews, features and interviews with the scene's most representative artists, as well as promising newcomers. 

Some of the artists who have been interviewed are Incognito, Teddy Riley, Amp Fiddler, Omar Lye-Fook, Carleen Anderson, Frank McComb, Rahsaan Patterson, James Poyser, etc.

In 2006, Eleonora released the compilation album Underground Soul vol. 1 on Expansion Records. 
The album was well received, reviewed as Album of the Fortnight on Blues & Soul Magazine, and supported by the likes of King Britt, 4Hero, Spacek, Ronnie Herel, Schoolboy Phillips and more.

The album launch party was held at Jazz Cafe, alongside label head Ralph Tee and Eric Roberson on stage.

Source: Underground Soul official website and Expansion Records website

Works about soul